Hans Moser may refer to:
Hans Gmoser (1932–2006), Canadian mountaineer, whose name is often misspelled
Hans Heinz Moser (1936–2017), Swiss actor
Hans Joachim Moser (1889–1967), German composer and musicologist
Hans Möser (1906–1948), SS concentration camp officer
Hans Moser (actor) (1880–1964), Austrian actor
Hans Moser (director) (1944–2016), German movie director
Hans Moser (handballer) (born 1937), Romanian-born German handball player
, president of the Federal Democratic Union of Switzerland
Hans Moser (rider) (1901–?), Swiss Olympic rider
Hans-Werner Moser (born 1965), German football coach and a former player